Live At O-East 20040305 is the first full-length live album by the Japanese horror punk band Balzac. It was released in a special package and was only available in the venues the band played during that tour. It was recorded at their performance at the O-East venue in 2004; the numbers in the album title represent the date of the event.

Track listing
"Beyond Evil 308 - The grave (Dreizehn)"
"Zetsubou-no-ano-basho-e"
"Season of the Dead"
"Inside My Eyes"
"Came Out of the Grave"
"Shi wo yubi sasu"
"In Your Face"
"The Silence of the Crows"
"The Pain (is all around)"
"Beware of Darkness"
"Art of Dying"
"The World Without End"
"Girl From Horrorwood"
"The End Of Century"
"Nowhere #13"
"Into The Light of the 13 Dark Night"
"Monster"
"Violent Paradise"
"Isolation From Nº 13"

Credits
 Hirosuke - vocals
 Atsushi - guitar, vocals, chorus
 Akio - bass guitar, chorus
 Takayuki - drums, chorus

External links
Official Balzac Japan site
Official Balzac USA site
Official Balzac Europe site

Balzac (band) albums
2005 live albums